William Franklin Culbert  (23 January 1935 – 28 March 2019) was a New Zealand artist, notable for his use of light in painting, photography, sculpture and installation work, as well as his use of found and recycled materials. 

He was born in Port Chalmers, near Dunedin, and divided his time between London, Croagnes in southern France, and New Zealand. He was married to artist Pip Culbert (1938–2016) and made many collaborative works with artist Ralph Hotere.

Early life and education
Culbert was educated at Hutt Valley High School, where his teachers included James Coe. He then studied at the Ilam School of Fine Arts at Canterbury University College in Christchurch from 1953 to 1956, alongside Pat Hanly, Gil Taverner, Quentin McFarlane, Trevor Moffitt, Ted Bracey, John Coley and Hamish Keith, many who lived in the same house in Armagh Street. Culbert received a National Art Gallery scholarship in 1957 and left New Zealand to study painting at the Royal College of Art, London. He exhibited in the Young Contemporaries and Young Commonwealth Artists exhibitions alongside fellow expatriate New Zealander Billy Apple.

Career
Culbert began to experiment with electric light in 1967. He had a solo exhibition at the Serpentine Gallery, London, in 1977. The touring survey exhibition Lightworks was organised by City Gallery Wellington in 1997. He participated in the first Auckland Triennial in 2001. In 2013 he represented New Zealand at the 55th Venice Biennale. His exhibition, titled Front Door Out Back, was displayed in the New Zealand pavilion, sited at the Istituto Santa Maria della Pietà.

He has permanent commissioned sculptures in London, Wellington and Auckland. Many are collaborative works with Ralph Hotere, including Fault on the facade of City Gallery Wellington (1994), Void (2006) in the atrium of Museum of New Zealand Te Papa Tongarewa and Black Stump, a 20m-high column outside the Vero Centre in Auckland. His work is held in public and private collections throughout New Zealand and Europe.

Culbert died on 28 March 2019.

Awards, honours and fellowships
National Art Gallery Scholarship (New Zealand), 1957
Artist in Residence, University of Nottingham, 1963–65
Greater London Arts Association Award, 1981
Arts Council of Great Britain Holographic Bursary, Goldsmiths' Holography Workshop, Goldsmiths' College, London, 1982
Residency, Museum of Holography, New York, 1985
Residency, Exploratorium, San Francisco, 1989
Member of the New Zealand Order of Merit, for services to art, particularly sculpture, 2008

References

Further reading
Ian Wedde, Making Light Work (Auckland: Auckland University Press, 2009)  
Justin Paton, Light Wine Things (Dunedin: Dunedin Public Art Gallery, 2005)  
Lara Strongman (ed.) Lightworks (Wellington: City Gallery Wellington, 1997)  
Christopher Moore , Lighting the way with art, in Stuff, 20 October 2011
John Daly-Peoples, The lightness of Bill Culbert, in National Business Review, 27 November 2009
David Eggleton, The lightness of being Bill Culbert, in The landfall review online, 1 June 2011
Gregory O'Brien, The Light Fantastic, in New Zealand Listener, 15 August 2009

External links
Artist page at Museum of New Zealand Te Papa Tongarewa
Sarah Farrar, Te Papa's Senior Curator Art, interviews Bill Culbert
Artist collection page at Christchurch Art Gallery
Artist page at Auckland Art Gallery
 Artist page at Laurent Delaye Gallery, London
Artist profile at Creative New Zealand

1935 births
2019 deaths
People from Port Chalmers
Ilam School of Fine Arts alumni
University of Canterbury alumni
Alumni of the Royal College of Art
New Zealand painters
Modern painters
Modern sculptors
People associated with the Museum of New Zealand Te Papa Tongarewa
20th-century New Zealand sculptors
20th-century New Zealand male artists
Members of the New Zealand Order of Merit
New Zealand contemporary artists
People educated at Hutt Valley High School